This is a list of artists who have recorded for Interscope Records. The names of Interscope affiliated labels, under which the artist recorded, can be found in parentheses.



0–9

 +44
 2Pac (Death Row/Amaru/Interscope) 
 2wo (Nothing/Interscope)
 4 Non Blondes
 42 Dugg (4PF/CMG/Interscope)
 4th Avenue Jones (Lookalive/Interscope)
 5 Seconds of Summer
 50 Cent (Aftermath/Shady/Interscope)
 6lack (LVRN/Interscope)

A
 AB Logic
 Abby Jasmine (Cinematic Music Group/Interscope/Geffen)
 AFI (DGC/Interscope)
 Agnes (US)
 Ai Bendr
 Akinyele
 Akira the Don
 Alessandro Safina
 Alexander 23
 Ali Lohan (Maloof Music/Interscope)
 All
 All Time Low
 Allison Ponthier
 Ama Lou
 Amber Mark (PMR/Interscope)
 ...And You Will Know Us by the Trail of Dead
 Ann Wilson
 Ari Lennox (Dreamville/Interscope)
 Arin Ray
 Ashlee Simpson (Geffen)
 Audio Push
 Audioslave (Epic/Interscope)
 Azealia Banks

B
 B.B. King
 Bad Gyal
 Bad Meets Evil
 Bad4Good
 Bahari (Rock Mafia, XIX Recordings/Interscope)
 Bas (Dreamville/Interscope)
 Basement Jaxx (DreamWorks/Ultra/Astralwerks/Interscope)
 Beck (DGC)
 Benny Blanco
 Big Bad Voodoo Daddy
 Big Kay Beezy
 Big30 (Bread Gang/N-Less/Interscope)
 Bilal
 Love on Ice
 Billie Eilish (Darkroom/Interscope)
 Black Tide
 Blackbear (Beartrap/Alamo/Interscope, now Sony Music)
 Blackpink (YG/Interscope)
 Blackstreet
 Blaqk Audio
 Blink-182 (DGC/Interscope)
 BlocBoy JB (CMG/Bloc Nation/Foundation/Interscope)
 Bobby Creekwater (Shady/Interscope)
 Bone Thugs-N-Harmony (Full Surface/Interscope)
 Brand New (DGC/Interscope)
 Brianna Adjei (El Cartel/Interscope)
 BRS Kash (Team Litty/LVRN/Interscope)
 Brutal Juice
 Bubba Sparxxx (Mosley/Interscope)
 Bush (Trauma/Interscope)
 Busta Rhymes (Aftermath/Interscope)

C
 Camila Cabello
 Campfire Girls (Boy's Life/Interscope)
 Carly Rae Jepsen (604/Schoolboy/Interscope) (outside Canada)
 Cashis (Shady/Interscope)
 Cashmere Cat (Mad Love/Interscope)
 Cassie (Bad Boy/Interscope)
 Celeste (Polydor/Interscope)
 Charles Hamilton (Demevolist Music Group/Interscope)
 Charlotte Sometimes (Geffen)
 Chauncey Black (Flipmode/Geffen)
 Chester French (Star Trak/Interscope)
 Chief Keef (Glo Gang/Interscope/1017 Bricksquad)
 Chris Cornell (Mosley/Interscope)
 Chris Rock (Geffen)
 Cinema Bizarre (MCA/Cherrytree/Interscope)
 Claw Hammer
 Clique Girlz
 Co Cash (CMG/Foundation/Committed/Interscope)
 Colby O'Donis (Konvict/Interscope)
 Colette Carr (Cherrytree/Interscope)
 Colorhaus
 Common (Geffen)
 Contradash
 Counting Crows (DGC)
 Cozz (Dreamville/Interscope)
 Crookers (Southern Fried/Potty Mouth/Fool's Gold/Interscope)
 Cruel Santino
 Crystal Lewis (GospoCentric/Interscope)
 Cuco

D
 DaBaby (South Coast/Billion Dollar Baby/Interscope)
 Daddy Yankee (El Cartel/Interscope)
 Dan Talevski (Zone 4/Interscope)
 Danny!
 Dashboard Confessional (DGC/Interscope)
 Dave
 Dawn Robinson (Aftermath/Interscope)
 Days of the New (Outpost/Geffen/Interscope)
 Daz Dillinger (Death Row/Interscope)
 Deep Blue Something
 Depswa
 Dermot Kennedy
 Destroy Lonely (Opium/Interscope)
 Devante (Aftermath/Interscope)
 Die Antwoord (Rhythm/Interscope) (outside South Africa)
 Disco Curtis (Myspace/Interscope)
 DJ AM
 DJ Moss irie
 Mustard (10 Summers/Interscope)
 DJ Snake
 Dr. Dre (Aftermath/Interscope)
 Dragpipe
 Dredg
 Drive Like Jehu
 d4vd (Darkroom/Interscope)

E
 EarthGang (Dreamville/Interscope)
 Easy Life
 El DeBarge (Geffen)
 Elah Hale
 Elbow
 Eli Derby
 Ella Mai (10 Summers/Interscope)
 Ellie Goulding (Polydor/Interscope) (US)
 Elliott Smith
 Elton John (Rocket/Interscope) (US)
 Eminem (Shady/Aftermath/Interscope)
 Emmy Rossum (Geffen)
 Enrique Iglesias
 Enter Shikari (Ambush Reality/Tiny Evil/DGC/Interscope)
 Ericdoa
 Escape the Fate (Eleven Seven Music)
 Esmée Denters
 EST Gee (CMG/Warlike/EST/Interscope)
 Eve (Ruff Ryders/Interscope)

F
 Fam-Lay (Star Trak/Interscope)
 Fergie
 Finneas
 Flipsyde (Cherrytree/Interscope)
 Flyleaf
 Focus... (Aftermath/Interscope)
 Frankmusik (Cherrytree/Interscope)
 Freddie Gibbs
 French Montana (Bad Boy/Interscope)

G
 Garbage (Almo Sounds/Interscope; US distributor 1998–2000, record label 2001–2004)
 Gerardo
 Giant Drag (Kickball/Interscope)
 Girlicious (Geffen)
 Girls' Generation (SM/Interscope)
 Giulietta (Giulietta R. Enterprises/Interscope)
 Glaive (musician)
 Glorilla (Collective/Interscope)
 Gracie Abrams
 Greyson Chance (eleveneleven/Interscope)
 Gryffin (Darkroom/Interscope)
 Guns N' Roses
 Gwen Stefani

H
 Haley Reinhart
 Hayd
 Helmet
 Hoku (Geffen)
 Holly Humberstone (Darkside/Interscope/Polydor)
 Hollywood Hot Sauce (Zone 4/Imani/Interscope)
 Hollywood Undead (A&M/Octone/Interscope)
 Hotboii (Rebel Music/Geffen/Interscope)
 Hot Rod (Phoenix/G-Unit/Interscope)

I
 Iayze
 Imagine Dragons (KIDinaKORNER/Interscope)
 Inhaler
 Institute

J
 J. Cole (Dreamville/Roc Nation/Interscope)
 J. Lewis
 J.I (G*Starr Ent./Geffen/Interscope)
 Jaboukie Young-White
 Jacob Banks (Interscope/Chambre Noire Record)
 Jacob Collier
 Jadakiss (Ruff Ryders/Interscope)
 Jae Lynx
 Jaira Burns
 James Morrison
 Jared Evan
 Jawny
 Jazmin Bean
  Jeon Somi (The Black Label/Interscope)
 Jessie Ware
 Jean Pierre Fontaine
 Jibbs (Geffen/Interscope)
 JID (Dreamville/Interscope)
 Jimmy Eat World (Geffen/DGC/Interscope)
 Joan As Police Woman
 JoJo (Blackground/Interscope)
 Jordan Knight
 Juice WRLD (Grade A/Interscope)
 Jurassic 5

K
 K Camp (RARE Sound/Interscope)
 K'naan (A&M/Octone)
 Kacey Musgraves (MCA Nashville/Interscope)
 Kaci Brown
 Kaki King
 Kali Uchis (Rinse/Virgin EMI/Interscope)
 Kardinal Offishall (Kon Live/Interscope)
 Kassi Ashton (MCA Nashville/Interscope)
 Kate Voegele (MySpace/DGC/Interscope)
 Kelis (will.i.am/Interscope)
 Ken Carson (Opium/Interscope)
 Kendrick Lamar (Aftermath/Interscope/pgLang)
 Kenna (Star Trak/Interscope)
 Keri Hilson (Zone 4/Mosley/Interscope)
 Kevvo
 Khea (Young Flex/Interscope)
 Kina Grannis
 King Tee (Aftermath/Interscope)
 Kurupt (Death Row/Interscope)

L
 La Roux (Cherrytree/Interscope)
 Lady Gaga (Streamline/Interscope)
 Lana Del Rey (Polydor/Interscope)
 LANY (Side Street/Polydor/Interscope)
 Lele Pons
 Li Heat
 Lifter
 Lil Durk (Only The Family/Alamo/Interscope, now Sony Music)
 Huddy (Immersive/Sandlot/Geffen/Interscope)
 Lil Mosey (Mogul Vision/Interscope)
 Lil Poppa (Rule #1/Interscope)
 Lil Scrappy (G'$ Up/Geffen/Interscope)
 Lil' D (CBE (Chris Brown Entertainment)/Interscope/No Limit Forever)
 Limp Bizkit (Flip/Interscope)
 Lindi Ortega
 Liz Huett
 Lloyd Banks (G-Unit/Interscope)
 LMFAO (will.i.am/Cherrytree/Interscope)
 Loretta Lynn
 Los (Bad Boy/Interscope)
 Louis the Child
 Love on Ice
 LPB Poody (Chameleon/Interscope)
 Lute (Dreamville/Interscope)

M
 Machine Gun Kelly (EST19XX/Bad Boy/Interscope)
 Madonna (Boy Toy/Live Nation/Interscope)
 Majek Fashek
 Mareva Galanter
 Marianas Trench
 Marilyn Manson (Nothing/Interscope)
 Marky Mark and the Funky Bunch
 Maroon 5 (222/Interscope)
 Marsha Ambrosius (Aftermath/Interscope)
 Matt Morris (Tennman/Interscope)
 Matt White (Rykodisc/Geffen/Interscope)
 Meiko (MySpace/DGC)
 Mereba
 M.I.A.
 Michael Kiwanuka
 Mickey Avalon (MySpace/Interscope)
 Midway State
 Midwxst
 Mindless Behavior
 Miss Willie Brown
 Mobb Deep (G-Unit/Interscope)
 Mohombi (Island/2101/Interscope)
 Moneybagg Yo (CMG/N-Less/Interscope)
 Monica
 Morray (Pick Six/Interscope)
 Mos Def (Geffen)
 Mt. Desolation (Cherrytree/Interscope)
 Mura Masa
 My Life with the Thrill Kill Kult
 Mýa (University/Interscope)

N
 Naliya
 Nate Dogg (Death Row/Interscope)
 Nelly Furtado (Mosley/Interscope)
 New Kids on the Block
 Nicole Scherzinger (RCA/Interscope)
 Nine Inch Nails (Nothing/Interscope)
 No Doubt
 NO1-Noah

O
 Obie Trice (Shady/Interscope)
 Olivia (G-Unit/Interscope)
 Olivia Rodrigo (Geffen/Interscope)
 OMG Girlz (Grand Hustle Records/Interscope)
 OneRepublic (Mosley/Interscope)
 Orianthi
 Outlawz (Death Row/Interscope)

P
 Paper Tongues
 Paradiso Girls
 Phantom Planet
 Pharrell Williams (Star Trak/Interscope)
 Phunk Junkeez
 Pi'erre Bourne (SossHouse/Interscope)
 Pia Toscano
 Pink Noise Test (Boy's Life/Interscope)
 Planet Asia
 Playboi Carti (AWGE/Interscope)
 Prick
 Prima J (Geffen)
 Primus
 Pseudopod
 Pure Soul

Q
 Queens of the Stone Age

R
 Rae Sremmurd (Eardruma/Interscope)
 Raekwon (Aftermath/Ice Water/Interscope)
 Rakim (Aftermath/Interscope)
 RBX (Death Row/Aftermath/Interscope)
 Red Café (Bad Boy/Interscope)
 Red Five
 Redfoo (will.i.am/Cherrytree/Interscope)
 Reneé Rapp
 Renforshort
 Rev Theory (DGC/Interscope)
 Reverend Horton Heat
 Rich Boy (Zone 4/Interscope)
 Rich The Kid (Rich Forever/Interscope)
 Richard Vission
 Ricky Guillart
 Rise Against
 Rivers Cuomo (DGC/Interscope)
 Rob Zombie (Geffen/Interscope)
 Robi
 Robin Thicke (Star Trek/Interscope)
 Robyn (Konichiwa/Interscope)
 Rocket From the Crypt
 Rocko (A1/Interscope)
 Role Model (Mad Love/Interscope)
 Rooney
 Rosanne Cash
 Rosemarie
 Rufus Wainwright (DreamWorks/Geffen/Interscope)
 Rvssian
 Rye Rye
 Ryn Weaver (Mad Love/Interscope)

S
 S Club (US)
 Sam Fender
 Sarah Proctor
 Scars on Broadway
 Schoolboy Q (TDE/Interscope)
 Sean "Diddy" Combs (Bad Boy/Interscope)
 Sebastian (Mosley Music Group/Interscope)
 Selena Gomez
 Sheck Wes (Cactus Jack/GOOD Music/Interscope)
 Shenseea
 Sheryl Crow (A&M; under Interscope 1999–2011)
 Simian Mobile Disco (Wichita/Interscope)
 Skylar Grey (Kidinakorner/Interscope)
 Smash Mouth
 Snake River Conspiracy
 Snoop Dogg (Death Row/Interscope)
 Social Code
 Solange (Geffen)
 Sophie Ellis-Bextor
 Soulja Boy (Stacks On Deck/Interscope)
 Space Cowboy (Southern Fried/Cherrytree/Interscope)
 Sparkle (Rockland/Interscope)
 Spensha Baker (A&M/Geffen/Interscope)
 SpotemGottem (Rebel/Geffen/Interscope)
 Stat Quo (Aftermath/Shady/Interscope)
 Static Revenger
 Still Woozy
 Sting
 Stunna 4 Vegas (South Coast/Billion Dollar Baby/Interscope)
 Styles P (Ruff Ryders/Interscope)
 Sugababes
 Summer Walker (LVRN/Interscope)
 Switches (US/Canada/Mexico)

T
 t.A.T.u. (T.A. Music/Interscope) (US)
 Tainy
 Taking Back Sunday (Victory/Warner Bros./Interscope)
 Tamar Kaprelian
 Tame Impala
 Tay Money
 Teairra Mari
 Tech N9ne (Strange Music)
 Teriyaki Boyz (Star Trak/Interscope)
 Teyana Taylor (Star Trak/Interscope)
 Tha Dogg Pound (Death Row/Interscope)
 The 1975 (Dirty Hit/Interscope)
 The All-American Rejects (Doghouse Records/Interscope)
 The Black Eyed Peas (will.i.am/A&M/Interscope)
 The Briefs
 The Cure (Geffen)
 The Diplomats
 The Firm (Aftermath/Interscope)
 The Fixxers (Dirty West/Interscope)
 The Fratellis (Island/Interscope)
 The Game (DGC/Interscope)
 The Hippos
 The Hives (Octone/A&M/Interscope)
 The Last Emperor (Aftermath/Interscope)
 The Lovemakers (Cherrytree/Interscope)
 The Lox (Ruff Ryders/Interscope)
 The Pipettes (Cherrytree/Interscope)
 The Pretty Reckless
 The Pussycat Dolls (A&M/Interscope)
 The Rasmus
 The Rolling Stones (US)
 The Shins
 The Storm
 The Wallflowers
 The Who (US)
 The Young Gods (Play It Again Sam/Interscope) (US)
 Toadies
 Tokio Hotel (Cherrytree/Interscope) (US)
 Tokyo's Revenge (Blac Noize!/Cypress Park Music/Geffen/Interscope)
 Tom Jones
 Tommy Sparks (Island/Interscope)
 Tony Yayo (G-Unit/Interscope)
 Tory Lanez (One Umbrella/Mad Love/Interscope Records)
 Travis Garland
 TRUSTcompany (Geffen)
 Truth Hurts (Aftermath/Interscope)

U
 U2 (US)
 Unwritten Law

V
 Vado
 Van Halen

W
 Wale (Allido/Interscope)
 Wax
 Weezer (DGC/Interscope)
 Westside Boogie (Shady/Interscope)
 White Lies (Geffen/Interscope)
 Wifisfuneral (Alamo Records/Interscope)
 Will Smith

X
 X Ambassadors  (KIDinaKORNER/Interscope)

Y
 Yeah Yeah Yeahs (Dress Up/DGC/Interscope)
 Years & Years (Polydor/Interscope)
 Yeat
 Young Buck (Cashville/G-Unit/Interscope)
 YSB Tril
 Yuksek
 Yung L.A. (Grand Hustle/Interscope)
 Yungblud (Geffen/Interscope)
 YXNG K.A

Z
 Zedd

References

 
Interscope Records, former